WEC 50: Cruz vs. Benavidez 2 was a mixed martial arts event held by World Extreme Cagefighting that took place on August 18, 2010 at The Pearl at The Palms in Las Vegas.

Background
This event marked WEC's first visit to Las Vegas since WEC 45 in December 2009 and was also shown on the TV channel Versus.

Urijah Faber was expected to make his bantamweight debut against Japanese striker Takeya Mizugaki. However, Faber was forced off the card with an injury. As a result, Mizugaki was also pulled from the event.  The Faber/Mizugaki bout was simply pushed back, to WEC 52. Faber won the rescheduled matchup by first round submission.

Stephan Bonnar served as color commentator for the event along with Todd Harris.

The event drew an average of 316,000 TV viewers.

Results

Bonus Awards
Fighters were awarded $10,000 bonuses.
Fight of the Night: Scott Jorgensen vs. Brad Pickett
Knockout of the Night: Maciej Jewtuszko
Submission of the Night: Anthony Pettis

Reported payout 
The following is the reported payout to the fighters as reported to the Nevada State Athletic Commission. It does not include sponsor money or "locker room" bonuses often given by the WEC and also do not include the WEC's traditional "fight night" bonuses.

Dominick Cruz: $22,000 (includes $11,000 win bonus) def. Joseph Benavidez: $17,500
Anthony Pettis: $12,000 ($6,000 win bonus) def. Shane Roller: $16,000
Chad Mendes: $11,000 ($5,500 win bonus) def. Cub Swanson: $11,000
Scott Jorgensen: $25,000 ($12,500 win bonus) def. Brad Pickett: $5,000
Bart Palaszewski: $16,000 ($8,000 win bonus) def. Zach Micklewright: $3,000
Javier Vazquez: $16,000 ($8,000 win bonus) def. Mackens Semerzier: $4,000 
Maciej Jewtuszko: $6,000 ($3,000 win bonus) def. Anthony Njokuani: $7,000
Ricardo Lamas: $14,000 ($7,000 win bonus) def. Dave Jansen: $4,000
Fredson Paixão: $6,000 ($3,000 win bonus) def. Bryan Caraway: $4,000
Danny Castillo: $19,000 ($9,500 win bonus) def. Dustin Poirier: $3,000

See also
 World Extreme Cagefighting
 List of World Extreme Cagefighting champions
 List of WEC events
 2010 in WEC

External links
Official WEC website

References

World Extreme Cagefighting events
2010 in mixed martial arts
Mixed martial arts in Las Vegas
2010 in sports in Nevada
Palms Casino Resort